Kessya Bussy (born 19 June 2001) is a French professional footballer who plays as a forward for Division 1 Féminine club Reims and the France national team.

Club career
Bussy started her senior career with Orléans. Following a good season with the club in Division 2 Féminine, she joined Reims in June 2020. She scored five goals and provided five assists in 22 matches in her first season with Reims. Her performance didn't go unnoticed as she was nominated for Best Young Player at Trophées UNFP du football and FFF D1 Arkema awards.

International career
Bussy is a former French youth international. She was part of under-19 team which won 2019 UEFA Women's Under-19 Championship.

On 1 June 2021, Bussy received maiden call-up to France senior team. She made her debut on 10 June in a 1–0 friendly win against Germany.

Career statistics

International

Scores and results list France's goal tally first, score column indicates score after each Bussy goal.

Honours

International
France U19
 UEFA Women's Under-19 Championship: 2019

References

External links
 
 Kessya Bussy at footofeminin.fr 
 

2001 births
Living people
Women's association football forwards
French women's footballers
France women's youth international footballers
France women's international footballers
Division 1 Féminine players
Division 2 Féminine players
Stade de Reims Féminines players
Footballers from Orléans